Kevin Casas-Zamora (born August 4, 1968) is a Costa Rican politician, lawyer and political scientist. Casas-Zamora is Secretary General of the International Institute for Democracy and Electoral Assistance, International IDEA, an inter-governmental organization based in Stockholm; and Senior Fellow and former Director of the Peter D. Bell Rule of Law Program at the Inter-American Dialogue, a policy research center based in Washington D.C. Prior to that he was Secretary for Political Affairs at the Organization of American States and Senior Fellow at the Brookings Institution. He also served as Minister of National Planning and Economic Policy as well as second Vice President of Costa Rica under Oscar Arias from May 8, 2006 until September 22, 2007.
He earned his JD from the University of Costa Rica, his MA from the University of Essex, and his DPhil from the University of Oxford. His doctoral thesis, titled “Paying for Democracy in Latin America: Political Finance and State Funding for Parties in Costa Rica and Uruguay,” won the 2004 Jean Blondel PhD Prize from the European Consortium for Political Research for best thesis in politics in Europe and was later developed into a book, under the title "Paying for Democracy." In 2007 Casas-Zamora was selected as Young Global Leader by the World Economic Forum. Since 2013, he is a member of the Bretton Woods Committee.

References 

1968 births
Living people
Vice presidents of Costa Rica
20th-century Costa Rican lawyers
Alumni of the University of Essex
Members of the Inter-American Dialogue